During the last three decades of the 19th century, Ira D. Sankey partnered Dwight Moody in a series of religious revivalist campaigns, mainly in North America and Europe.   Moody preached,  Sankey sang; as part of his musical ministry, Sankey collected hymns and songs, and in 1873 published in England the original edition of Sacred Songs and Solos, a short collection of 24 pages containing some of the favourite hymns that Sankey had introduced during the  first Moody and Sankey evangelistic tour of Britain, in 1873–1875. Over the following years new, expanded editions of Sacred Songs were produced, containing many standard hymns as well as revivalist songs, the final edition from the 1900s containing 1,200 pieces. Sankey wrote the words for very few of these, but he composed and/or arranged new tunes for many of the hymns in the collection, particular for those written by Fanny Crosby.  The following lists contains all the hymns composed by Sankey that are found in the "1200" edition of Sacred Songs and Solos.  Many of these hymns are also found in the six-volume collection, Gospel Hymns and Sacred Songs, which Sankey edited with Philip Bliss and others, which was published  in the United States between 1876 and 1891.

Table of hymns

Notes and references

Notes

Citations

Sources

 (year of publication approximate) unpaginated
 (year of publication approximate) unpaginated
Hymnary.org (an online database of hymns and hymnals hosted by Calvin College's Calvin Institute of Christian Worship and Christian Classics Ethereal Library)

Protestant hymns